Neil V. Boyer (born 1940) is an American oboist.

Biography 
Boyer is a native of Kentucky who was trained at Mannes School of Music in New York and Stony Brook University.

Boyer was principal oboist in the Vermont Symphony Orchestra from 1972–1996, and has been principal oboist in the Portland Symphony Orchestra (Maine) since 1973.

He has taught at the University of Vermont and Bowdoin and Bates Colleges. He is currently the oboe instructor at Dartmouth College and the University of Southern Maine.

References

American oboists
Male oboists
Living people
1940 births
Place of birth missing (living people)
Stony Brook University alumni
Mannes School of Music alumni
University of Vermont faculty
Bates College faculty
Dartmouth College faculty
University of Southern Maine faculty